John Shrader Garth (1909-1993) was a 20th century American naturalist and professor who specialized in marine crustaceans and butterflies.  The crab genus Johngarthia is named for him.

Early life and education
John Garth was born in Los Angeles, California, on October 3, 1909, to a family that lived in nearby Long Beach. He graduated from Polytechnic High School in Long Beach in 1927. A skilled pianist, he earned a bachelor's degree in music at the University of Southern California in 1932. He was a member of the Yosemite School of Field Natural History and a temporary ranger naturalist at Glacier National Park in 1935, the year he earned a Master of Science degree from U.S.C., where he studied with Irene McCulloch, specialist on the Foraminifera.  He performed summer work at Cornell University in 1937 and the University of Pennsylvania in 1940.  He was awarded a Ph.D., also from U.S.C., in 1941.  By the time he earned his degree, he had published four papers on butterflies and three on crabs.

Career

While still an undergraduate, Garth came to the attention of G. Allan Hancock, a biologist and skipper of the U.S.C. research vessel Velero III, who was looking for a pianist to accompany him on an expedition to the then-largely uncharted Galapagos Islands. During long nights at sea, Hancock liked to play the cello, but his usual accompanist and sometime first mate suffered from seasickness and refused to go on such a long voyage.  A call to U.S.C.’s Department of Music connected Hancock to Garth.  Garth departed on the first of many cruises in 1931 and was nicknamed “Bugs” by the ship’s scientists for his entomological interests.

Garth participated in 10 major Hancock expeditions over the course of his career, to places such as Mexico, Central and South America, and the Galapagos.  He later visited the Marshall Islands, India, Ceylon, and the Maldive Islands.  On his own, he undertook research through Europe and to Australia’s Great Barrier Reef.  He was also an expert on the variety of butterflies found in U.S. parklands, including those indigenous to Yosemite National Park, Grand Canyon National Park and Glacier National Park.

During World War II, Garth served as a civilian instructor and in the Sanitary Corps of the Army Medical Department. Upon returning to U.S.C., he resumed his study of crabs and for a decade taught a course on arthropod vectors of parasites.  This expanded into a course on crustacean biology, possibly the first in the United States. 

Garth retired from U.S.C. in 1975, continuing his research and teaching at a slower pace as a professor emeritus of biological sciences and chief curator emeritus of the Allan Hancock Foundation. He published numerous articles, monographs and a book, California Butterflies, which earned him the Lepidopterist Society’s John Adams Comstock Award for research in 1987.  He was also the author of The Spider Crabs of the Pacific Coast of the Americas, published in 1956.

Marriage, family, and later life
Garth married Isla Lora Detter in 1940.  They had one child, daughter Linda Jean, born January 16, 1945. Linda Jean died suddenly on October 20, 1967. She was not married and had no children.  John Garth died October 18, 1993, at his home in Long Beach.

References

Naturalists
Lepidopterists
Carcinologists
1909 births
1993 deaths
Scientists from Los Angeles